Senator Stack may refer to:

Brian P. Stack (born 1966), New Jersey State Senate
Mike Stack (born 1963), Pennsylvania State Senate